Dhubri Girls' College, established in 1983, is a general degree women's college situated in Dhubri, Assam. This college is affiliated with the Gauhati University. This college offers different bachelor's degree courses in arts.

References

External links
http://www.dgcollegedhubri.org/

Universities and colleges in Assam
Colleges affiliated to Gauhati University
Educational institutions established in 1983
1983 establishments in Assam